William Edward "Little Willie" John (November 15, 1937 – May 26, 1968) was an American R&B singer who performed in the 1950s and early 1960s. He is best known for his successes on the record charts, with songs such as "All Around the World" (1955), "Need Your Love So Bad" (1956), "Talk to Me, Talk to Me" (1958), "Leave My Kitten Alone" (1960), "Sleep" (1960), and his number-one R&B hit "Fever" (1956). An important figure in R&B music of the 1950s, he faded into obscurity in the 1960s and died while serving a prison sentence for manslaughter. 

John was posthumously inducted into the Rock and Roll Hall of Fame in 1996. In 2022, John was inducted into the Blues Hall of Fame.

Biography
John was born in Cullendale, Arkansas on November 15, 1937. He was one of ten children born to Lillie (née Robinson) and Mertis John. Many sources erroneously give his middle name as Edgar. His family moved to Detroit, Michigan, when he was four, so that his father could find factory work. In the late 1940s, the eldest children, including Willie, formed a gospel singing group. Willie also performed in talent shows, which brought him to the notice of Johnny Otis and, later, the musician and producer Henry Glover. After seeing him sing with the Paul "Hucklebuck" Williams orchestra, Glover signed him to a recording contract with King Records in 1955. He was nicknamed "Little Willie" for his short stature.

John's first recording, a version of Titus Turner's "All Around the World", was a hit, reaching number 5 on the Billboard R&B chart. He followed up with a string of R&B hits, including the original version of "Need Your Love So Bad", co-written with his elder brother Mertis John Jr. One of his biggest hits, "Fever" (1956) (Pop number 24, R&B number 1), sold over one million copies and was awarded a gold disc. A famous cover version was recorded by Peggy Lee in 1958. Another song, "Talk to Me, Talk to Me", recorded in 1958, reached number 5 on the R&B chart and number 20 on the Pop chart. It also sold over one million copies. A few years later it was a hit once again in a cover version by Sunny & the Sunglows. On December 23, 1959, John also recorded "I'm Shakin'", by Rudy Toombs, "Suffering with the Blues", and "Sleep" (1960, Pop number 13). In all, John made the Billboard Hot 100 a total of fourteen times. A cover version of "Need Your Love So Bad" by Fleetwood Mac was also a hit in Europe. Another of his songs to be covered was "Leave My Kitten Alone" (1959), recorded by The Beatles in 1964 and intended for their Beatles for Sale album. However, the track was not released until 1995.

John performed for the famed Cavalcade of Jazz concert produced by Leon Hefflin Sr. held at the Shrine Auditorium in Los Angeles on August 3, 1958. The other headliners were Ernie Freeman and his Band, Ray Charles, Sam Cooke, The Clark Kids and Bo Rhambo. Sammy Davis Jr. was there to crown the winner of the Miss Cavalcade of Jazz beauty contest. The event featured the top four prominent disc jockey of Los Angeles.

John was involved in the civil rights fight against segregation. He performed a benefit concert for the NAACP in 1964, telling Jet magazine: "As entertainers, we can no longer sit and wait for the Sammy Davis' and Harry Belafonte's to raise all of the money."

John was also known for his short temper and propensity to abuse alcohol. He was arrested multiple times for charges that include narcotics, swindling, and grand larceny. John was dropped by his record company, King Records, in 1963. In 1965, he was convicted of manslaughter for the 1964 stabbing of Kendall Roundtree in Seattle. He was sent to Washington State Penitentiary in Walla Walla. John appealed the conviction and was released on probation while the case was reconsidered, during which time he recorded what was intended to be his comeback album. Due to contractual disputes and the decline of his appeal, it was not released until 2008 (as Nineteen Sixty Six).

John died at Washington State Penitentiary on May 26, 1968. Despite counterclaims, the cause of death stated on his death certificate was a heart attack. His interment was in Detroit Memorial Park East, in Warren, Michigan.

John was survived by his wife Darlynn (née Bonner), whom he married on May 25, 1957; two children, William Kevin John (b. February 3, 1958) and Darryl Keith John (b. January 25, 1960); his mother; five brothers; three sisters. One of his sisters was Mable John, who recorded for Motown and Stax and was member of The Raelettes, the vocal quartette backing Ray Charles. His son Keith John is a backing vocalist for Stevie Wonder.

Legacy and honors 
John was posthumously inducted into the Rock and Roll Hall of Fame in 1996, presented by Stevie Wonder.

James Brown, who early in his career had opened shows for John, recorded a tribute album, Thinking About Little Willie John and a Few Nice Things.

The guitarist and songwriter Robbie Robertson, formerly of The Band, mentioned John in the song "Somewhere Down the Crazy River", on his 1987 self-titled album. John was also mentioned in Tom Russell's "Blue Wing" and Mark Lanegan's "Like Little Willie John", from his 2004 album Bubblegum. The Swedish singer songwriter Peter LeMarc recorded a song entitled "Little Willie John" in 1991.

A biography, Fever: Little Willie John, a Fast Life, Mysterious Death and the Birth of Soul, by Susan Whitall with Kevin John (another of his sons), was published by Titan Books in 2011.

Little Willie John was posthumously inducted into the Rhythm and Blues Music Hall of Fame in 2014 as a singer and in 2016 as a songwriter.

In June 2016, Little Willie John was inducted into the Michigan Rock and Roll Legends Hall of Fame.

In 2022, John was inducted into the Blues Hall of Fame. His induction citation noted "... John was a sharply attired and exciting showstopper, recalled by fellow singers as mischievous, fun-loving, and generous".

Singles discography

References

External links
 Little Willie John on AllMusic
 
 

1937 births
1968 deaths
20th-century African-American male singers
People from Ouachita County, Arkansas
American soul singers
American rock singers
The Midnighters members
King Records artists
20th-century American singers
Singers from Detroit
20th-century American male singers
Singers from Arkansas